Marble Creek may refer to:

Marble Creek (Mississippi River), a stream in Missouri
Marble Creek (St. Francis River), a stream in Missouri